Aspergillus pseudocaelatus is a species of fungus in the genus Aspergillus. It was first isolated from an Arachis burkartii leaf in Argentina. It is most related to the non-aflatoxin producing Aspergillus caelatus, producing aflatoxins B and G, as well as cyclopiazonic acid and kojic acid.

Growth and morphology

A. pseudocaelatus has been cultivated on both Czapek yeast extract agar (CYA) plates and Malt Extract Agar Oxoid® (MEAOX) plates. The growth morphology of the colonies can be seen in the pictures below.

References

Further reading

pseudocaelatus